Partners with Mel Tiangco is a 2004 Philippine television talk show broadcast by GMA Network. Hosted by Mel Tiangco, it premiered on February 15, 2004 replacing Partners Mel and Jay. The show concluded on July 25, 2004 with a total of 24 episodes. It was replaced by Mel & Joey in its timeslot.

References

2004 Philippine television series debuts
2004 Philippine television series endings
Filipino-language television shows
GMA Network original programming
Philippine television talk shows